The  is a private university in Shimonoseki, Yamaguchi, Japan, established in 1974.

Faculties (Undergraduate Schools)

Faculty of Human Sciences
Department of Humanities and Social Sciences
Psychology Course
Child Development Course
Culture and Tourism Course
Department of Sports and Health Sciences
Sports and Health Sciences Course
Sports Management Course

Faculty of Medical Technology
Department of Medical Engineering
Medical Engineering Course
Emergency Medical Lifesaving Course
Medical Information Course
Social Welfare Course
Department of Human Nutrition Care

Faculty of Design
Department of Design
Animation and Graphic Design Course
Interior Design Course
Art Course
System Design Engineering Course
Department of Total Beauty
Beauty + Haircut Course
Esthetics Course
Fashion Environment Course

Graduate Schools

Graduate School of Integrated Science and Art

Campus
Shin-Shimonoseki

Research institute
Counseling and Research Center for Clinical Psychology

Institutes
University Library
Career Center
International Student Center(留学生相談センター)
Gymnasium

See also
Shin-Shimonoseki Station
Shimonoseki City

External links
 Official website 

Educational institutions established in 1966
Private universities and colleges in Japan
Shimonoseki
University of East Asia
1966 establishments in Japan